Thomas Erwin Zenk (November 30, 1958 – December 9, 2017) was an American professional wrestler and bodybuilder. He was best known for his appearances with the World Wrestling Federation from 1986 to 1987, American Wrestling Association (AWA) 1988 to 1989 and with World Championship Wrestling from 1989 to 1994, as well for his tours of Japan with All Japan Pro Wrestling.

Early life 
Zenk was born in Golden Valley, Minnesota. He attended Robbinsdale High School in Robbinsdale, Minnesota. His 1976 graduating class included fellow future professional wrestlers Brady Boone, Barry Darsow, Curt Hennig, Nikita Koloff, and Rick Rude. He attended the University of Minnesota, where he majored in speech communications.

Bodybuilding career 
Zenk competed as a bodybuilder. In October 1980, he competed in the "Mr. North Country" competition, placing third. In July 1981, he participated in the "Mr. Minnesota" competition, winning championships in the overall, heavyweight, and "most muscular" divisions.

Professional wrestling career

Early career (1984–1986) 
Zenk was introduced to professional wrestling by Road Warrior Animal, who he met at a bodybuilding contest. He was trained to wrestle by Brad Rheingans and Eddie Sharkey. He debuted in early 1984 with Mid-South Wrestling in Louisiana. In mid-1984, Zenk joined the Minneapolis, Minnesota-based American Wrestling Association, where he performed as an undercard wrestler until September 1985. He was named Rookie of the Year for 1984 by the Wrestling Observer Newsletter, tying with Jushin Liger.

In October 1985, Zenk joined the Portland, Oregon-based Pacific Northwest Wrestling promotion, where he received a push. In December 1985, he and Scott Doring won the NWA Pacific Northwest Tag Team Championship. They lost the Championship to Bobby Jaggers and Rip Oliver the following month. In the same month, Zenk defeated Jaggers for the NWA Pacific Northwest Heavyweight Championship. He held the Championship until March 1986, when Jaggers regained it. Between May 1985 and October 1986, Zenk also wrestled intermittently with the Montreal-based Lutte Internationale promotion in Canada, where he won the Canadian International Tag Team Championship with Dan Kroffat.

World Wrestling Federation (1986–1987) 
In October 1986, Zenk and Martel were signed by the World Wrestling Federation. They teamed together as The Can-Am Connection. In the opening bout of WrestleMania III on March 29, 1987, The Can-Am Connection defeated Don Muraco and Bob Orton, Jr.

The Can-Am Connection were planned to become the WWF's top face tag team and to win the WWF World Tag Team Championship, but in mid-1987 Zenk resigned from the WWF due to a pay dispute.

All Japan Pro Wrestling (1986–1989) 
In November and December 1986, Zenk and Rick Martel toured Japan with All Japan Pro Wrestling, competing in the annual Real World Tag League. He and Martel received the World's Strongest Tag Determination League Fighting Spirit Award.

Between 1987 and 1989, Zenk made multiple tours of Japan with All Japan Pro Wrestling (AJPW).

American Wrestling Association (1988, 1989) 
Zenk returned to the American Wrestling Association to wrestle a handful of matches in early 1988. He returned again one year later. On May 1, 1988, Zenk took part in the "Battle of Breakfast Cereal", a show recorded for the breakfast cereal manufacturer Kellogg's for a sales conference in which Kelloggs-themed characters faced characters themed after General Mills, Kellogg's' main competitor. In the main event, Zenk and Greg Gagne (wrestling as "The Sales And Marketing Team") defeated Pat Tanaka and Paul Diamond (wrestling as "The Mills Brothers"). Zenk left the AWA once more later that month. This era of The AWA (1985 to 1990) was seen for many years onward, appearing on The ESPN Network Television, as afternoon time-slot re-runs.

On February 7, 1989, Zenk competed in a 20-man battle royal for the vacant AWA World Heavyweight Championship in which he was the last man eliminated by the winner, Larry Zbyszko. He challenged Zbyszko in several return matches before moving to WCW.

World Championship Wrestling (1989–1994) 
While touring with All Japan Pro Wrestling in 1989, Zenk was signed to a two year contract with World Championship Wrestling by president Jim Herd. He debuted at Fall Brawl '89 in September 1989 under the ring name "The Z-Man", defeating The Cuban Assassin.

In 1990, Zenk formed a tag team with Brian Pillman. In February 1990, they won the vacant NWA United States Tag Team Championship, defeating The Fabulous Freebirds in the finals of a tournament. They went on to feud with The Midnight Express, who won the Championship from them in May 1990.

During this time, Zenk tore a muscle while weightlifting and took several months off to recover. He appeared more slender upon returning. Z-Man then feuded with Arn Anderson over the World Television Championship, eventually winning the title. When the promotion changed its name to World Championship Wrestling in 1991, Z-Man officially became the final NWA World Television Champion and the first WCW World Television Champion. He re-lost the title to Anderson on January 7, 1991. Later that year, Z-Man, Dustin Rhodes and Big Josh feuded with The York Foundation and The Fabulous Freebirds over the World Six-Man Tag Team Championship. Z-Man, Rhodes and Josh won the title from the Freebirds in August, and lost it to The York Foundation in October.

At Halloween Havoc 1991, Zenk lost to the debuting WCW Phantom.

In October 1992 he also worked for New Japan Pro-Wrestling while under contract with WCW teaming with Jim Neidhart.

In 1993, Zenk teamed with Ricky Steamboat as "Dos Hombres" subbing for Shane Douglas, but was announced as Douglas.

All Japan Pro Wrestling (1994) 
After Zenk's release from WCW in May 1994, he participated in All Japan Pro Wrestling's (AJPW) Summer Action tour that July, and their Giant Series tour in September.

Late career (1994–1996) 
After WCW and All Japan, Zenk worked in his home state Minnesota where he worked in the independent circuit. In August 1996, Zenk joined the American Wrestling Federation (AWF), where he ultimately finished his career a few months later, in October.

Death 
Zenk died in Robbinsdale, Minnesota, on December 9, 2017, at the age of 59, from atherosclerosis and cardiomegaly. He was interred at St. Nicholas Cemetery in Carver, Minnesota.

Championships and accomplishments
All Japan Pro Wrestling
World's Strongest Tag Determination League Fighting Spirit Award (1986) – with Rick Martel
World Championship Wrestling
NWA/WCW World Television Championship (1 time)
NWA United States Tag Team Championship (1 time) - with Brian Pillman
WCW World Six-Man Tag Team Championship (1 time) - with Dustin Rhodes and Big Josh
Lutte Internationale
Canadian International Tag Team Championship (1 time) - with Dan Kroffat
Pacific Northwest Wrestling
NWA Pacific Northwest Heavyweight Championship (1 time)
NWA Pacific Northwest Tag Team Championship (1 time) - with Scott Doring
Pro Wrestling Illustrated
PWI ranked him #38 of the 500 best singles wrestlers of the year in the PWI 500 in 1992
PWI ranked him #343 of the top 500 singles wrestlers of the "PWI Years" in 2003
Ultimate Championship Wrestling
UCW Championship (1 time)
Wrestling Observer Newsletter
Rookie of the Year (1984) tied with Jushin Liger
World Wrestling Federation
Tag Team Tournament (1987) - with Rick Martel

References

External links 
 
 
 

1958 births
2017 deaths
20th-century professional wrestlers
American male professional wrestlers
Deaths from atherosclerosis
NWA/WCW World Television Champions
People from Robbinsdale, Minnesota
Professional wrestlers from Minnesota
University of Minnesota alumni
NWA/WCW United States Tag Team Champions